The WWC North American Tag Team Championship was a major tag team championship that was used and defended in Capitol Sports Promotions. It is sometimes referred to as the WWC North American Tag Team Championship, though this isn't entirely accurate since the promotion didn't change its name from Capitol Sports Promotions to World Wrestling Council until the mid-1990s. The promotion, still in operation today, is based out of Puerto Rico and was a National Wrestling Alliance affiliate until 1988. This title was the third NWA sanctioned championship to be called NWA North American Tag Team Championship and, while its name suggests it was a nationally defended title, it was actually only used within the Puerto Rico territory.

Title history

References

External links
Wrestling-Titles.com
Wrestling Information Archive

National Wrestling Alliance championships
Tag team wrestling championships
World Wrestling Council championships
North American professional wrestling championships